{{DISPLAYTITLE:Eta2 Hydri b}}

Eta2 Hydri b (η2 Hyi b, η2 Hydri b), commonly known as HD 11977 b, is an extrasolar planet that is approximately 217 light-years away in the constellation of Hydrus. The presence of the planet around an intermediately massive giant star provides indirect evidence for the existence of planetary systems around A-type stars.

References

External links
  
 

Hydrus (constellation)
Giant planets
Exoplanets discovered in 2005
Exoplanets detected by radial velocity